Caspian Telecom LLC is an Azerbaijan-based telecommunications company founded in 1997. The company provides a wide range of telecommunication services (any scale private networks, broadband, data, SWIFT, etc.) using its fiber-optic infrastructure, as well as acting as a system integrator for a wide range of telecom routing. Caspian Telecom also offers cable television and internet provider services under brand names “Ailə TV” and “Ailə NET”.

Company overview
The company is located at 251A, Dilara Aliyeva Street, AZ1010 Baku, Azerbaijan.

Specialization
CISCO, Broadband, SWIFT, LAN, WAN, Security, Fiber Optics, Routing Switching

See also
 Telecommunications in Azerbaijan
 Ministry of Communications and Information Technologies (Azerbaijan)
 List of Azerbaijani companies

References

External links
 
 A number of companies are moving in to provide both the public and private sector - The Business Year
 https://web.archive.org/web/20140302083527/http://abc.az/eng/b2b/678.html
 http://www.companies-reviews.com/review/449390/Caspian-Telecom-LLC/
 https://web.archive.org/web/20140302152003/http://abc.az/eng/news/63253.html
 https://web.archive.org/web/20140219204317/http://abc.az/eng/news/73336.html
 https://web.archive.org/web/20140221144228/http://www.ictnews.az/read.php?lang=2&result=ok&content=12167
 http://en.trend.az/regions/scaucasus/azerbaijan/2215727.html
 http://www.bakutel.az/

Telecommunications companies of Azerbaijan
Telecommunications companies established in 1997
Internet service providers of Azerbaijan
Companies based in Baku
Azerbaijani brands